Zelkova carpinifolia, known as  Caucasian zelkova, Caucasian elm or just zelkova, is a species of Zelkova, native to the Caucasus, Kaçkar, and Alborz mountains in the extreme southeast of Europe and southwest Asia.

The crown is a highly distinctive vase-shape, with a short broad trunk dividing low down into numerous nearly erect branches. The flowers are inconspicuous and greenish, with no petals, and are wind-pollinated. The fruit is a small nutlet  in diameter.

It is grown as an ornamental tree in Europe (huge exemplars of it can be found quite often in the western Georgian province of Imereti, used for decorating courtyards in villages and providing pleasant shade) and more rarely in North America (where the related Japanese Z. serrata is more popular).
Hybrid cultivars
Zelkova × verschaffeltii

References
 Andrews, S. (1994). Tree of the year: Zelkova. Int. Dendrol. Soc. Yearbook 1993: 11-30.
 Hunt, D. (1994). Beware of the Zelkova. Int. Dendrol. Soc. Yearbook 1993: 33-41.
 Rushforth, K. (1999). Trees of Britain and Europe. HarperCollins .

carpinifolia
Trees of Western Asia
Flora of Southeastern Europe